Kolokani Airport  is an airstrip serving Kolokani in Mali.

See also
Transport in Mali

References

 OurAirports - Mali
  Great Circle Mapper - Kolokani
 Kolokani
 Google Earth

External links

Airports in Mali